Taipei Red Lions F.C. were a professional football club from Taipei, last participating in Taiwan Football Premier League.
 Red Lions has won two Taiwan Football Premier League promotion tournaments, six Taipei International Football Leagues, one Businessmen Football League, one Taipei Super Cup and several local and international short tournaments.

Taipei Red Lions football team was founded in 1983 as the amateur team from Tianmu, Shilin District.

In 1989 Red Lions were one of the founding members of the Businessmen Football League, the top amateur league in Taiwan for many years.

In 2005 Red Lions were one of the founding members of Taipei International Football League, a highly inclusive tournament suitable for players of all ages and nationalities that has become the strongest annual amateur league in Taiwan.

In 2017 Red Lions signed a cooperation agreement with Taicheng Football Academy to train world-class football players and teams in the most systematic and creative way to ensure that the team has the highest level of football.

The outstanding performance of Taipei Red Lions in the amateur league and the cooperation agreement signed with Taicheng Football Academy motivated the team to participate in Taiwan First Division Qualifiers in 2017, winning the tournament and the right to join CTFA top level league in 2018.

In 2018 Red Lions signed a cooperation agreement with University of Taipei to foster the best young talents in Taiwan as international-level professional football players and create real benefits for future generations.

History
Under their new name of Taicheng Lions, the club qualified for the 2018 TFPL Qualification Tournament. A 3–2 victory over Ming Chuan University was followed by a 1–1 draw and penalty shootout defeat to Tainan City, meaning that they had to defeat fellow newcomers Bear Bro Ilan to assure themselves of qualification. A resounding 17–0 victory gained them the first position in the qualifiers and ensured that Taicheng Lions would compete in the Taiwan Football Premier League in 2018.

The success of the project quickly catches the attention of the football community and many of the staff and players from Taicheng Lions were recruited for teams in China, Spain or around Taiwan. The team had to rebuilt the project in 2019 with new youth talent. In 2019 Red Lions and Taicheng merged and the club decided to use the same Red Lions name for all its teams. Once again at the end of 2019 season many players were transferred to teams in Chile, Cambodia and Taiwan, making the them one of the most prominent players' developer in the island.

The new club was formed in 2021 after the Zhanyi Group took over the license of Red Lions. The new owners opted to relaunch the club as a new entity, branding the new side Flight Skywalkers.

Symbols

Red colour 
It represented the passion of the team for football and its fans, just like the Taipei City flag symbolized caring for society.

Crest  
Red Lions crest was a red circular affair with the eponymous red lion taking central part. Inside the circle was the name of the team in Chinese (台北紅獅足球俱樂部), and the year the team was founded (1983). The lion symbolized courage, majesty, and the strength of the club.

Mascot 
The name of the mascot was Dahong (大鴻), big red in Chinese, a red dancing lion that represents good luck and fortune, also the team work necessary in football.

Final squad

Final staff

Honours

References

Football clubs in Taiwan
1983 establishments in Taiwan
Association football clubs established in 1983
2021 disestablishments in Taiwan
Association football clubs disestablished in 2021